Shihan is a Japanese title for a master of martial arts

Shihan may also refer to:
Shihan (newspaper), Jordanian weekly newspaper
Shihan- a single hill that stands out well in the relief; the remotest elevation with the right slopes and top.

Shihan is also a given name, especially among Sri Lankans. People with the name Shihan include:
Shihan Mihiranga Bennet, Sri Lankan singer